Paulina Käte Krumbiegel (born 27 October 2000) is a German footballer who plays as a midfielder for 1899 Hoffenheim and the Germany women's national team.

Career
Krumbiegel made her international debut for Germany on 22 September 2020, starting in the away match against Montenegro in UEFA Women's Euro 2021 qualifying, which finished as a 3–0 win.

Career statistics

International

International goals
Scores and results list Germany's goal tally first:

References

External links
 
 
 
 
 

2000 births
Living people
Footballers from Mannheim
German women's footballers
Germany women's international footballers
Germany women's youth international footballers
Women's association football midfielders
TSG 1899 Hoffenheim (women) players
Frauen-Bundesliga players
2. Frauen-Bundesliga players